Konstantin "Kostya" Nerchenko (Russian: Константин Нерченко; born 1985) is a Russian bodybuilder, powerlifter, strongman, master of Sambo, and personal trainer.

Biography 
As a teenager, he was training in various athletic and combat sports. Nerchenko is a super-heavyweight bodybuilder, his weight is approx. 100 kilograms. His first bodybuilding competition, Moscow Oblast Championships, took place in October 2009 in Mytishchi. During the contest Nerchenko placed second in super-heavyweight category (100+ kg). The same month, at Saint Petersburg/Leningrad Oblast Championships, he placed seventh in 100+ kg category. Nerchenko contended in other tournaments, also in super-heavyweight category: at 2009 Moscow City Championships he took the fifth place, and at 2011 Moscow Cup he placed sixth. He's also an awarded powerlifter, a three-time champion of Moscow and the Moscow Oblast bench press championships.

Nerchenko lives in Moscow Oblast and works as personal trainer at the pilates/fitness studio; he acquired first experiences in his profession in 2003. He's also a strongman, and a certified Master in Sports of Sambo. Muscles and Testosterone called Nerchenko "the most underrated person in athletic sports history".

References

External links 
 Konstantin Nerchenko's Facebook fan page
 Nerchenko's VK fan page

Nerchenko, Konstantin
Nerchenko, Konstantin
Nerchenko, Konstantin
Nerchenko, Konstantin
Nerchenko, Konstantin
Nerchenko, Konstantin